Proinos Kafes (English: Morning Coffee; Greek: Πρωϊνός Καφές) was a television daytime show aired by ANT1 in Greece during the period 1991–2009.  Though it has received low ratings in the past years, it was one of the longest running and well known shows in Greece. The show consisted of different segments which included fashion shows, game and prizes, interviews, and live music from Greek and foreign artists.

'Proinos Kafes previous hosts': 1991-1994: Roula Koromila, 1994-1995: Popi Chadzidimitriou, 1995-2005: Eleni Menegaki, 2005-2008: Eleonora Meleti 2008-2009 Katerina Zarifi and Nikos Moutsinas 2009 George Lianos and Despoina Kabouri, 2009- Vicky Kaya

Since the start of the show in 1991, the show has toured different parts of Greece including different areas of Athens, Heraklio on the island of Crete, Patras, Thessaloniki and many other places in Greece.

The theme song of Proinos Kafes, was "Kalimera" - a song originally sung by Alexia Vassiliou, also known as, Alexia, in her 1990 album, 'Ela Mia Nyxta'.

Hosts

Timeline

Special hosts

Panelists

Astrology

Cinema

Cooking

Fashion expert

Nutrition

Gymnastics

See also
List of programs broadcast by ANT1

ANT1 original programming
1991 Greek television series debuts
2009 Greek television series endings
1990s Greek television series
2000s Greek television series
Greek-language television shows